The Assemblies of the Lord Jesus Christ (ALJC) is a Oneness Pentecostal Holiness Christian denomination formed in 1952 by the merger of the Assemblies of the Church of Jesus Christ, the Jesus Only Apostolic Church of God, and the Church of the Lord Jesus Christ. The organization describes itself as "a continuation of the great revival that began on the day of Pentecost at Jerusalem, A.D. 30, and is founded upon the foundation of the Apostles and Prophets, Jesus Christ Himself being the Chief cornerstone, (Acts 2:1-41; Ephesians 2:19, 20)."

History
Various groups throughout the country went by different names trying and striving to promote the Gospel of Jesus Christ. Finally in the month of March, 1952, three groups known as the Assemblies of the Church of Jesus Christ, Jesus Only Apostolic Church of God, and the Church of the Lord Jesus Christ, formulated a merger adopting the name Assemblies of the Lord Jesus Christ, which is Apostolic in Doctrine and Teachings, and the Bible as their guide book.

Since 1952 the following, among others, have served as General Chairman/General Superintendent of the organization: 

 David Mayo
 Lester McGruder 
 Raymond Bishop
 Don Johnson
 Steve Wilson 
 Robert Martin 
 Kenneth Carpenter

Beliefs
In doctrine, the ALJC is similar to other Oneness Pentecostal churches. They believe in the oneness of God.  The basic and fundamental doctrine of the Organization is the Bible standard of full salvation, which is repentance, baptism in water by immersion in the name of Jesus Christ for the remission of sins, and the baptism of the Holy Ghost with the evidence of speaking with other tongues as the Spirit gives the utterance (Acts 2:4,38; John 3:5).

Structure
The Assemblies of the Lord Jesus Christ has approximately 420 churches in North America with over 1500 licensed ministers.  Internationally the organization is currently supporting 20 missionaries who are overseeing works in 17 different nations and regions as well as numerous indigenous organizations which are affiliated with the ALJC in North America, South America and Africa.  The ALJC is primarily centered in Indiana, Ohio, Louisiana, Mississippi, Tennessee, Georgia, North Carolina, and Texas.

The organization is led by an executive board, consisting of a general superintendent, three assistant superintendents (regional representatives from different regions of the United States), and a general secretary/treasurer. The current executive board is made up of the following ministers: Rev. Kenneth Carpenter (general superintendent), Rev. Jonathan Vazquez (1st assistant superintendent/Southern regional representative), Rev. Kenneth Allen (2nd assistant superintendent/Northern regional representative), Rev. Robert Wimberley (3rd assistant superintendent/Western regional representative), and Rev. Roger Gray (general secretary/treasurer).

The Assemblies of the Lord Jesus Christ supports Parkersburg Bible College, New Beginnings Adoption program, an international Shortwave Radio broadcast called "The Apostolic Witness" and a monthly inter-organizational magazine titled "The Apostolic Witness."  .

References

External links
Assemblies of the Lord Jesus Christ
Matthew Corbitt, Author/Practitioner
First Apostolic Church of Knoxville TN

Christian organizations established in 1952
Pentecostal denominations in North America
Oneness Pentecostal denominations
Christian denominations established in the 20th century
Christian new religious movements
1952 establishments in the United States